Mohammed Yaseen Mohammed (7 January 1963 – 24 June 2020) was an Iraqi weightlifter. He competed at the 1980 Summer Olympics and the 1984 Summer Olympics. 

On 24 June 2020, he died in Sweden after suffering from a COVID-19 infection during the COVID-19 pandemic in Sweden.

References

External links
 

1963 births
2020 deaths
Iraqi male weightlifters
Olympic weightlifters of Iraq
Weightlifters at the 1980 Summer Olympics
Weightlifters at the 1984 Summer Olympics
People from Erbil
Asian Games medalists in weightlifting
Weightlifters at the 1982 Asian Games
Asian Games bronze medalists for Iraq
Medalists at the 1982 Asian Games
Deaths from the COVID-19 pandemic in Sweden
20th-century Iraqi people